Marianna is a city in and the county seat of Jackson County, Florida, United States, and it is home to Chipola College. The population was 6,102 at the 2010 census. In 2018 the estimated population was 7,091. The official nickname of Marianna is "The City of Southern Charm".

History

Marianna was founded in 1828 by Scottish entrepreneur Scott Beverege, who named the town after his daughters Mary and Anna. The following year, it was designated as the county seat, superseding the earlier settlement of Webbville, which soon after dissolved and no longer exists. Marianna was platted along the Chipola River. Many planters from North Carolina relocated to Jackson County to develop new plantations to take advantage of the fertile soil. They relied on the labor of enslaved African Americans brought from the Upper South in the domestic slave trade.

Civil War era

Governor John Milton, a major planter who owned the Sylvania Plantation and hundreds of slaves, was a grandson of Revolutionary War hero John Millton, and a descendant of Sir Christopher Milton, the brother of the famous English poet, John Milton. However, Milton did not have to rely solely on a distinguished American founding family name. A Marianna resident, he was elected as governor of Florida, serving during the Civil War years. Governor Milton opposed the Confederate States of America rejoining the United States.

As federal troops were preparing to take control of Tallahassee, Governor Milton received word that the Civil War had ended and that Florida would again be part of the United States. On April 1, 1865, as the Southern cause was collapsing, Milton died of a gunshot wound from his gun at Sylvania. A New York Times article, written in polemic style, attributed Governor Milton's sudden death to suicide, which conflicted with local reporting from Florida. The Governor's words, likely political oratorical hyperbole, that he "would rather die" than suffer the humiliation of Federal invasion, were linked to his sudden death by the New York Times. The West Florida News reported the sudden death of Florida's fifth Governor as a hunting accident. Governor Milton was buried in the St. Luke's Episcopal churchyard at Marianna. The New York Times article's account persisted in the difficult days of Reconstruction.

Marianna was the site of a Civil War battle in 1864 between a small home guard of about 150 boys, older men, and wounded soldiers, and a contingent of approximately 700 Federal troops.

Reconstruction period

During the early years after the Civil War, violence flared in Marianna and Jackson County, where 150 to 200 Republicans, some black, were assassinated in what was known as the Jackson County War by members of the Ku Klux Klan in an effort to secure white supremacy. Locals claimed this was the work of "ruffians" from border states and carpetbaggers. Bishop Charles H. Pearce of Massachusetts, an AME minister who became a state senator in Florida, had first-hand knowledge of the situation. He placed the blame on the planters of Jackson County, who supported action against black Republicans. Disputes over farm land caused much of the disorder, as poor whites objected to negro ownership of choice farms.

Post-Reconstruction to mid-20th century

Violence continued in the state after Reconstruction, reaching a peak in most areas at the turn of the 20th century. This was the period in which southern states also disenfranchised most blacks and thousands of poor whites by raising barriers to voter registration. From 1900 to 1930, Florida had the highest rate of lynchings per capita in the South and the nation. Refusing to accept the violence, thousands of African Americans left the state during the Great Migration of the early 20th century, going to northern and midwestern industrial cities for work and other opportunities.

Lynchings in Marianna

In 1934 Claude Neal, a local African-American man, was accused of the rape and murder of a young white woman. He was moved between jails, but a lynch mob found him in Brewton, Alabama. The mob abducted him and brought him back to Florida, killing him near the Chattahoochee River and Greenwood. The men brought his body to the Cannady farm, where a larger mob of an estimated 2,000 persons was waiting; people shot and mutilated the body. Neal's body was hanged from a tree at the Marianna courthouse square. The next day, whites rioted in town, attacking blacks and destroying some of their houses. The governor ordered more than 100 troops of the National Guard to Marianna to suppress the violence. About 200 blacks and two police were injured. The six white vigilantes who led the lynching remain unidentified.

In 1943 Cellos Harrison was taken from the county jail at Marianna by a white mob and hanged (lynched) near Greenwood. His case had been in the courts for two years in appeals after the African-American man was arrested and twice convicted by all-white juries and sentenced to death for the 1940 murder of a white man. He had confessed without benefit of counsel, and his convictions were overturned by the Florida Supreme Court as a result. But whites were tired of waiting for the case to be resolved, and lynched him. President Franklin D. Roosevelt directed the Department of Justice to investigate Harrison's lynching; he felt it was unjust that blacks were getting lynched at home while the U.S. was ostensibly fighting for freedom in Europe. No one was ever prosecuted for Harrison's death.

Florida School for Boys

The Florida School for Boys, a large state reform school, operated in Marianna from January 1, 1900, to June 30, 2011. For a time, it was the largest juvenile reform institution in the United States. Throughout its 111-year history, the school gained a reputation for abuse, beatings, rapes, and torture of students by staff. It was rumored that students had died there as a result of injuries. Despite periodic investigations, changes of leadership, and promises by the state to improve conditions, the allegations of cruelty and abuse continued.

Many of the allegations were confirmed by separate investigations by the Florida Department of Law Enforcement in 2010 and the Civil Rights Division of the United States Department of Justice in 2011. State authorities closed the school permanently in June 2011. In 2015, a multi-year investigation of the cemetery and grounds by the University of South Florida (USF), which was attempting to find undocumented burials on the grounds, revealed details of a secret "rape dungeon", where boys younger than 12 were sexually abused. It positively identified five bodies from remains recovered on the grounds. By January 2016, the end of the USF's studies of the grounds and exhumation of remains, it had identified 55 previously unknown burials, made a match for seven bodies through DNA, and presumptively identified another 14 sets of remains of 51 found. Twenty-seven more graves were discovered in 2019. The team created a website containing documentation of their investigation and will continue to work with state agencies and families of former students to identify more remains.

Hurricane Michael 

The city was one of several Florida Panhandle communities devastated by Category 5 Hurricane Michael on October 10, 2018. The downtown area was heavily hit, with several historic buildings collapsing and blocking Lafayette Street, which is the main road. The city was without power for three weeks, which caused extensive school cancellations. More than 80% of homes and businesses in Marianna were heavily damaged or destroyed due to Michael's extreme winds. Millions of dollars in insurance claims were filed and the area also suffered millions of dollars in economic losses. This hurricane is the worst natural disaster to ever strike Marianna, surpassing the damages caused by a F-3 tornado spawned by Hurricane Ivan in September 2004.

Geography

Marianna is located in central Jackson County at  (30.776370, –85.238149). U.S. Route 90 passes through the center of town as Lafayette Street, leading east  to Grand Ridge and west  to Cottondale. Interstate 10 passes through the southern end of the city, leading east  to Tallahassee, the state capital, and west  to Pensacola. Access to Marianna is at Exit 136, Florida State Road 276.

The Chipola River, which forms the eastern border of the city, is part of the Apalachicola River watershed.

Climate

Demographics

2020 census
Note: the US Census treats Hispanic/Latino as an ethnic category. This table excludes Latinos from the racial categories and assigns them to a separate category. Hispanics/Latinos can be of any race. 

As of the 2020 United States census, there were 6,245 people, 3,071 households, and 1,476 families residing in the city.

2000 census
As of the census of 2000, there were 6,230 people, 2,398 households, and 1,395 families residing in the city. The racial makeup of the city was 56.8% White, 40.2% African American, 0.3% Native American, 0.7% Asian, 0.9% from other races, and 1.1% from two or more races. Hispanic or Latino of any race were 2.6% of the population.

There were 2,398 households, out of which 28.8% had children under the age of 18 living with them, 34.3% were married couples living together, 20.7% had a female householder with no husband present, and 41.8% were non-families. 38.0% of all households were made up of individuals, and 19.3% had someone living alone who was 65 years of age or older. The average household size was 2.22 and the average family size was 2.96.

In the city, the population was spread out, with 26.7% under the age of 18, 11.8% from 18 to 24, 22.3% from 25 to 44, 18.4% from 45 to 64, and 20.8% who were 65 years of age or older. The median age was 36 years. For every 100 females, there were 88.9 males. For every 100 females age 18 and over, there were 76.7 males.

The median income for a household in the city was $23,861, and the median income for a family was $29,590. Males had a median income of $28,500 versus $21,530 for females. The per capita income for the city was $14,021. About 20.9% of families and 28.5% of the population were below the poverty line, including 41.7% of those under age 18 and 34.6% of those age 65 or over.

Education

Jackson County School Board operates public K–12 schools. Marianna has four schools, all of which usually perform in the high C-low B range in the state's FCAT grade scale. Marianna K-8 for grades PK–8, and Marianna High School for grades 9–12, Jackson Alternative School for grades 4-12, and Hope School for grades PK-12.

Chipola College, home of the Chipola Indians, is the choice for many residents and offers dual-enrollment classes for high school students. The college is a four-year state institution offering bachelor's degrees in nine programs. Additionally, students can earn masters and doctoral degrees on the Chipola Campus through Troy State University, University of Florida, University of West Florida, and Florida State University.

From 1961 to 1966, a junior college, Jackson Junior College, served African-American students. It closed in 1966 after passage of the Civil Rights Act of 1964 and the opening of Chipola Junior College (today Chipola College) to all students.

The main branch of the Jackson County Library System is located in Marianna at 2929 Green Street. In 2018 it underwent a remodel and now offers an improved children's area, as well as an elevator and ADA accessible restrooms. The library provides public computers with internet access, free Wi-Fi, and numerous programs for every age group. The Jackson County Library System is also a member of the Panhandle Public Library Cooperative System (PPLCS). Membership in PPLCS enables Jackson County library users access to many online resources such as Rosetta Stone, genealogy and automotive repair databases, and downloadable E-books and E-audio books, in addition to a shared catalog of library materials from Jackson, Calhoun, and Holmes County Library Systems.

Transportation

Highways

  Interstate 10
  State Road 71
  State Road 73

Railroads

Freight service is provided by the Florida Gulf & Atlantic Railroad, which acquired most of the former CSX main line from Pensacola to Jacksonville on June 1, 2019.

Airports

Marianna Municipal Airport was developed at a former World War II Army Air Corps base that was transferred to the city.

Attractions

Marianna is an official Florida Main Street town. The downtown area has been restored to look as it did many years ago, to encourage heritage tourism and emphasize its unique character and a pedestrian-friendly neighborhood. The downtown area includes the Marianna Historic District, which has a number of antebellum homes.

There is also cave diving in underwater Blue Springs. St. Luke's Episcopal Church and cemetery are state landmarks, as they had a principal role in the U.S. Civil War battle of Marianna in 1864.

The Chipola River is a source of recreation during all but the winter months.

Notable people

 Kelly J. Baker, writer and editor
 Tim Davis, former pitcher for the Seattle Mariners
 Cliff Ellis, basketball head coach, Coastal Carolina University, born in Marianna
 Timothy Thomas Fortune, civil rights leader, writer, born in Marianna
 Bobby Goldsboro, pop and country singer-songwriter, born in Marianna
 Alex Hamilton (born 1993), basketball player for Hapoel Eilat in the Israeli Basketball Premier League
 David Hart, actor, TV series In the Heat of the Night
 George Sydney Hawkins, politician and justice
 Caroline Lee Hentz, novelist and author
 Danny Lipford, home improvement expert
 Moss Mabry, Academy Award-nominated costume designer
 Jeff Mathis, professional baseball player
 John Milton, governor of Florida during the Civil War
 William Hall Milton, U.S. senator
 Claude Neal, African-American victim of torture and spectacle lynching in 1934 after being accused of rape
 Sam E. Parish, 8th Chief Master Sergeant of the Air Force
 Rick Pearson, professional golfer
 Pete Peterson, American politician and diplomat
 Wankard Pooser, politician
 Edd Sorenson, professional cave diver
 Jim Sorey, professional football player
 Ret Turner, Emmy Award-winning costume designer
 Doug Woodlief, professional football player

Gallery

References

External links

City of Marianna official website
The Battle of Marianna

Cities in Jackson County, Florida
County seats in Florida
Populated places established in 1828
1828 establishments in the United States
Cities in Florida